"Goldilocks and the Three Bears" is the 9th episode of the television anthology Faerie Tale Theatre. The story is based on the Robert Southey's story of the same title and stars Tatum O'Neal as Goldilocks.

Plot
The episode features an extended story based on the events of the original fairytale, where Goldilocks' visit to the Bears' home is only a small portion of the overall plot.

The story is being told by a Ranger (Hoyt Axton), who relates to the audience the incident of Goldilocks and the Three Bears. Goldilocks (Tatum O'Neal) is introduced as a pretty young girl with golden curls who likes to play tricks on others and tell wild stories.

In the nearby wood, a family of bears consisting of Papa Bear, Mama Bear and Cubby Bear wake up from hibernation in their little cottage. One day, Mama Bear cooks some porridge, but it turns out to be too hot, so the family goes out for a walk to let it cool off.

At this time, Goldilocks happens to be out exploring when she stumbles upon the bears' house. She invites herself in, helps herself to their porridge (Cubby's is the only bowl that is good), sits in their chairs (Cubby's breaks under her weight) and lies down in their beds (Cubby's is the most comfortable and she goes to sleep). As she is sleeping, the bear family returns and sees the result of Goldilocks' tampering. Papa Bear wakes Goldilocks up, and when she sees the bears in the bedroom, she screams and runs off. When she reaches home, she goes into a frenzy telling her parents about the bears, but they don't believe her.

The next day, Goldilocks' father punishes her by ordering her to pull all the weeds from their house's front lawn. When the Ranger walks by, Goldilocks claims she has no idea what to do and sweetly asks him to demonstrate. When the Ranger gets to the job, Goldilocks sneaks off to her secret hiding place in the woods.

As she's playing, Cubby Bear accidentally finds her. At first, Cubby is angry at Goldilocks for what she did the day before, but Goldilocks spins another tall tale that she's an orphan and was so desperate for food and a place to stay, and that was why she broke into their house. Cubby believes her story and, feeling sorry for her, invites her back to the bear home. When Mama Bear and Papa Bear hear her story they welcome her in, but Papa Bear advises her to learn to respect other people's property and not repeat what she did. Goldilocks agrees, and jumps on their invitation to stay with them, believing that her father is still angry with her.

That night, Goldilocks doesn't return home, and her parents are filled with worry.

The days pass with Goldilocks spending time with the bear family, having fun and playing games. But then one day, the Ranger arrives at the house, and when he describes Goldilocks' physical description, Papa Bear pulls her out from her hiding place in the bedroom. At first, Goldilocks starts to tell another lie that she was kidnapped by the bear family, but she cannot go through with it because she has become genuinely fond of the bears. Goldilocks apologizes for her mistakes in the past and returns home, where her parents embrace her.

The Ranger then gives an epilogue explaining that Goldilocks has changed her ways, continued to be friends with the bear family, and eventually gave birth to a daughter of her own with identical golden curls.

Cast

Pop culture references
This episode refers to the Yogi Bear cartoon with the use of a character called "The Ranger" and with a line where Papa Bear says, "If it has something to do with those stolen picnic baskets, we have nothing to do with that".
The piece that Goldilocks' mother is sewing displays the words: "My Life is a Tapestry". Carole King, who played Goldilocks' mother, is famous for her Tapestry album.

Visual style

Each episode of the series had its own visual style based on the works of a particular painter or illustrator. The artists were chosen by Shelley Duvall and included Gustav Klimt (Rapunzel) and Edmund Dulac (The Nightingale). The visual style of the Goldilocks episode was modeled after the works of Norman Rockwell.

Reviews

When released on video in 1990, this episode received less than stellar reviews. Steven Rea of the Philadelphia Inquirer noted that "there isn't enough story to sustain Goldilocks and The Three Bears for the length of the film.

See also
 List of Faerie Tale Theatre episodes

External links

Footnotes 

Faerie Tale Theatre episodes
1984 American television episodes
Films based on Goldilocks and the Three Bears
Films directed by Gilbert Cates